The men's team sprint event at the 2020 Summer Olympics took place on 3 August 2021 at the Izu Velodrome. 24 cyclists (8 teams of 3) from 8 nations competed.

Background

This will be the 6th appearance of the event, which has been held at every Summer Olympics since 2000.

The reigning Olympic champions are Philip Hindes, Jason Kenny, and Callum Skinner of Great Britain; it was the third consecutive victory for Great Britain in the event (all three times with Kenny on the team). The reigning (2020) World Champions are Roy van den Berg, Harrie Lavreysen, and Jeffrey Hoogland of the Netherlands. Great Britain had the second place team, including Kenny, at the World Championships.

Qualification

A National Olympic Committee (NOC) could enter up to 1 team of 3 cyclists in the men's team sprint. Quota places are allocated to the NOC, which selects the cyclists. Qualification is entirely through the 2018–20 UCI nation rankings. The eight top NOCs on the ranking list qualified for the team sprint event. These nations also received the right to enter two cyclists each in the individual sprint and Keirin. Because qualification was complete by the end of the 2020 UCI Track Cycling World Championships on 1 March 2020 (the last event that contributed to the 2018–20 rankings), qualification was unaffected by the COVID-19 pandemic.

Competition format

A men's team sprint race consists of a three-lap (750 m) race between two teams of three cyclists, starting on opposite sides of the track. Each member of the team must lead for one of the laps. The time for a team is measured to when the last cyclist finishes. Ties are broken by splits on the last lap.

The tournament consists of an initial qualifying round that seeds the teams. The first round comprises head-to-head races based on seeding (1st vs. 8th, 2nd vs. 7th, etc.). The winners of those four heats advance to the medal round, with the two fastest winners competing in the gold medal final and the two slower winners facing off for bronze.

Schedule
All times are Japan Standard Time (UTC+9)

Results

Qualifying

First round

Finals

References

Men's team sprint
Cycling at the Summer Olympics – Men's team sprint
Men's events at the 2020 Summer Olympics